Abner Lloveras Hernández (born September 4, 1982, in Barcelona) is a Spanish professional mixed martial artist in the lightweight division. Abner received a gold medal in the Spanish Olympic boxing tournament in 2010.  He also competed on The Ultimate Fighter: Team McGregor vs. Team Faber.

Biography 
Lloveras was born on September 4, 1982 in Barcelona , Spain . At the age of 17, Lloveras began practicing martial arts, primarily kickboxing . At the age of 20, Lloveras moved to London , England , where he went on to train boxing at the All Stars. While he was training in boxing, Lloveras accepted the challenge of learning jiu-jitsu and, very soon after, at the age of 21, he made his MMA debut at the UKMMAC 8 event in August 2004.

Boxing career 
In his career as a boxer, Lloveras has had about 30 amateur bouts, of which he has only lost one. He participated for 3 years in the Spanish Olympic Boxing Championship, where he won the gold medal 3 times, and also participated in the Pre-Olympic Qualifying Tournament in Turkey for the London Olympics .

In 2014 he won the gold medal at the United Arab Emirates National Championship, during the period he lived in Dubai.

Mixed martial arts career

Early career
Lloveras made his professional MMA debut in August 2004 with the UK Mixed Martial Arts Championship promotion in England.  Over the next decade, he would compete for a variety of promotions including Shooto and M-1 Global as he amassed a record of 19 wins against 7 losses. One of Lloveras most notable bouts during this period was with UFC fighter Phillipe Nover.

The Ultimate Fighter
On August 31, 2015, it was announced that Lloveras would be a contestant on the 22nd season of The Ultimate Fighter reality show.  In the elimination round, he defeated Vlado Sikic by verbal submission due to a shoulder injury.  In the preliminary round, he defeated Jason Gonzalez by unanimous decision.  In the quarterfinals, Lloveras lost to Julian Erosa on a split decision.

Ultimate Fighting Championship
Lloveras faced fellow cast member Chris Gruetzemacher at the TUF 22 Finale on December 11, 2015.  On a fairly competitive three rounds, with Abner almost finishing the fight with a standing rear-naked choke, he lost the bout by unanimous decision and was subsequently released from the promotion.

Post-UFC 
Lloveras faced UFC veteran Andre Winner on June 25, 2016, for the SHC interim welterweight title, in Geneva. He lost the fight via split decision.

Championships and accomplishments

Mixed martial arts
Respect Fighting Championship
Respect Lightweight Championship (One time; current)

2015 best MMA fight by GNP MAGAZINE in Europe

Kickboxing
Kickboxing Spain
Amateur champion (2005)

Boxing
Boxing Spain
Spain champion (2010, 2011 and 2012)

Mixed martial arts record

|-
|Loss
|align=center|22–13–1
|Jason Ponet 
|Decision (unanimous)
|MMA GP Bordeaux
|
|align=center|3
|align=center|5:00
|Bordeaux, France
|
|-
|Loss
|align=center|22–12–1
|Thibault Gouti
|TKO (punches)
|War of Titans 2
|
|align=center|1
|align=center|2:49
|Madrid, Spain
|
|-
| Loss
|align=center|22–11–1
|Jim Wallhead
|Decision (unanimous)
|Bellator Newcastle
|
|align=center|3
|align=center|5:00
|Newcastle upon Tyne, England
|
|-
| Win
|align=center|22–10–1
|Alessandro Botti
|TKO (punches)
|Italian Cage Fighting 4
|
|align=center|1
|align=center|3:46
|Milan, Italy
|
|-
| Loss
|align=center|21–10–1
|Farès Ziam
|KO (punch)
|Hit Fighting Championship 5
|
|align=center|2
|align=center|0:24
|Horgen, Switzerland
|
|-
| Win
|align=center|21–9–1
|Davy Gallon
|KO (punch)
|Arnold Fighters/Titan Channel: War of Titans
|
|align=center|3
|align=center|3:44
|Barcelona, Spain
|
|-
| Win
|align=center|20–9–1
|Maxim Maryanchuk
|KO (kick to the body)
|ADW: Road to Abu Dhabi 4
|
|align=center|2
|align=center|4:18
|Sofia, Bulgaria
|
|-
|Loss
|align=center|19–9–1
|Andre Winner
|Decision (split)
|SHC 11
|
|align=center|3
|align=center|5:00
|Geneva, Switzerland
|
|-
|Loss
|align=center|19–8–1
|Chris Gruetzemacher
|Decision (unanimous)
|The Ultimate Fighter: Team McGregor vs. Team Faber Finale
|
|align=center|3
|align=center|5:00
|Las Vegas, Nevada, United States
|
|-
| Win
| align=center| 19–7–1
| Nordin Asrih
| Decision (unanimous)
| Respect FC 12
| 
| align=center| 5
| align=center| 5:00
| Wuppertal, Germany
| Won the vacant Respect Lightweight Championship.
|-
| Win
| align=center| 18–7–1
| Jonas Boeno do Rosario
| Decision (unanimous)
| Ansgar Fighting League 2
| 
| align=center| 3
| align=center| 5:00
| Fuenlabrada, Spain
| 
|-
| Win
| align=center| 17–7–1
| Miguel Valverde
| Submission (guillotine choke)
| International Fighting Championship
| 
| align=center| 1
| align=center| 1:09
| Badalona, Spain
| 
|-
| Win
| align=center| 16–7–1
| Pierre Chretien
| Submission (guillotine choke)
| Ansgar Fighting League 1
| 
| align=center| 1
| align=center| 1:05
| Barcelona, Spain
| 
|-
| Loss
| align=center| 15–7–1
| Mike Campbell
| Decision (unanimous)
| CES MMA: Undisputed 2
| 
| align=center| 5
| align=center| 5:00
| Lincoln, Rhode Island, United States
| 
|-
| Win
| align=center| 15–6–1
| Ryan Quinn
| Decision (unanimous)
| CES MMA: Proving Grounds
| 
| align=center| 3
| align=center| 5:00
| Lincoln, Rhode Island, United States
| 
|-
| Win
| align=center| 14–6–1
| Rich Moskowitz
| Decision (unanimous)
| Premier Fighting Championship 7
| 
| align=center| 3
| align=center| 5:00
| Amherst, Massachusetts, United States
| 
|-
| Win
| align=center| 13–6–1
| Ralph Johnson
| Submission (armbar)
| Paul Vandale Promotions: The Beast Comes East
| 
| align=center| 1
| align=center| 2:49
| Worcester, Massachusetts, United States
| 
|-
| Loss
| align=center| 12–6–1
| Shamil Zavurov
| TKO (punches) 
| M-1 Challenge 22: Narkun vs. Vasilevsky
| 
| align=center| 4
| align=center| 4:22
| Moscow, Russia
| For the vacant M-1 Global Welterweight Championship.
|-
| Win
| align=center| 12–5–1
| Danny Covin
| TKO (punches)
| Hombres de Honor 15
| 
| align=center| 2
| align=center| 0:49
| Barcelona, Spain
| 
|-
| Win
| align=center| 11–5–1
| Berrie Bunthof
| KO (punch)
| M-1 Selection 2010: Eastern Europe Finals	
| 
| align=center| 1
| align=center| 3:23
| Moscow, Russia
| 
|-
| Win
| align=center| 10–5–1
| Miljan Jaksic
| Submission (rear-naked choke)
| M-1 Selection 2010: Western Europe Round 3
| 
| align=center| 1
| align=center| 4:20
| Helsinki, Finland
| 
|-
| Loss
| align=center| 9–5–1
| Leandro Frois Lopes
| Decision (unanimous)
| Fight 4 Life
| 
| align=center| 3
| align=center| 5:00
| Barcelona, Spain
| 
|-
| Win
| align=center| 9–4–1
| Sunnat Ilyasov
| KO (knees and punches)
| M-1 Selection 2010: Western Europe Round 1
| 
| align=center| 2
| align=center| 1:18
| Hilversum, Netherlands
| 
|-
| Win
| align=center| 8–4–1
| Luiz Andrade I
| Decision (unanimous)
| M-1 Challenge 18: Netherlands Day Two
| 
| align=center| 2
| align=center| 5:00
| Hilversum, Netherlands
| 
|-
| Win
| align=center| 7–4–1
| Gael Grimaud
| Decision (split)
| M-1 Challenge 14: Japan
| 
| align=center| 3
| align=center| 5:00
| Tokyo, Japan
| 
|-
| Win
| align=center| 6–4–1
| Carlos Valeri
| KO (punches)  
| Almogavers 1 
| 
| align=center| 2
| align=center| 0:24
| Barcelona, Spain
| 
|-
| Loss
| align=center| 5–4–1
| Erik Oganov
| Decision 
| M-1 MFC: Battle on the Neva
| 
| align=center| 3
| align=center| 5:00
| Saint Petersburg, Russia
| 
|-
| Win
| align=center| 5–3–1
| Ramon Diaz
| Decision (unanimous)
| Hummer Man Fight 1
| 
| align=center| 3
| align=center| N/A
| Guadalajara, Spain
| 
|-
| Win
| align=center| 4–3–1
| Lola Bamgbala
| Submission (kimura)
| UKMMAC 17: Iron Circle
| 
| align=center| 1
| align=center| N/A
| England
| 
|-
| Loss
| align=center| 3–3–1
| Phillipe Nover
| Decision (majority)
| ROC 12 - Tournament of Champions Quarterfinals 
| 
| align=center| 2
| align=center| 5:00
| Atlantic City, New Jersey, United States
| 
|-
| Win
| align=center| 3–2–1
| Marius Doczi
| Decision (unanimous) 	 
| Shooto - Spain
| 
| align=center| 2
| align=center| 5:00
| Spain
| 
|-
| Win
| align=center| 2–2–1
| Marcos de Paulo
| TKO (punches) 	 
| MMA Vitoria 1
| 
| align=center| 1
| align=center| 3:40
| Vitória, Brazil
| 
|-
| Loss
| align=center| 1–2–1
| Oliver Jones
| Submission (rear-naked choke)
| Extreme Fighting 1
| 
| align=center| 2
| align=center| 4:38
| London, England
| 
|-
| Draw
| align=center| 1–1–1
| Lola Bamgbala
| Draw
| UKMMAC 12: Brutal Beatdown
| 
| align=center| 3
| align=center| 5:00
| Essex, England
| 
|-
| Win
| align=center| 1–1
| Tom Lowman
| Submission (guillotine choke)
| UKMMAC 10: Slugfest
| 
| align=center| 1
| align=center| 4:45
| Essex, England
| 
|-
| Loss
| align=center| 0–1
| Darren Guisha
| TKO (leg injury)
| UKMMAC 8: Natural Force
| 
| align=center| 3
| align=center| 3:59
| Essex, England
|

Mixed martial arts exhibition record

|-
|Loss
|align=center|2–1
| Julian Erosa
| Decision (split)
| The Ultimate Fighter: Team McGregor vs. Team Faber
| (airdate)
|align=center|3
|align=center|5:00
|Las Vegas, Nevada, United States
|
|-
|Win
|align=center|2–0
| Jason Gonzalez
| Decision (unanimous)
| The Ultimate Fighter: Team McGregor vs. Team Faber
| (airdate)
|align=center|2
|align=center|5:00
|Las Vegas, Nevada, United States
|
|-
|Win
|align=center|1–0
| Vlado Sikic
| TKO (shoulder injury)
| The Ultimate Fighter: Team McGregor vs. Team Faber
| (airdate)
|align=center|1
|align=center|3:33
|Las Vegas, Nevada, United States
|

Except where otherwise indicated, details provided in the record box are taken from Sherdog.

References

External links

 
M-1 Mixfight Profile for Abner Lloveras
Official Website of Esport Rogent

1982 births
Living people
Spanish male mixed martial artists
Welterweight mixed martial artists
Mixed martial artists utilizing boxing
Mixed martial artists utilizing Muay Thai
Mixed martial artists utilizing Brazilian jiu-jitsu
Spanish Muay Thai practitioners
Spanish practitioners of Brazilian jiu-jitsu
Sportspeople from Barcelona
Spanish male boxers
Spanish male kickboxers
People from Ludlow, Massachusetts
Ultimate Fighting Championship male fighters